Fancypants Hoodlum is the debut album by Canadian musician Merrill Nisker, who later became famous under the name Peaches.

Track listing

Personnel 
Merrill Nisker – vocals
Ian Sinclair – backing vocals, bass guitar
John Gzowski – guitar, production
Harvey Danger – drums
Jim English – production

References

1995 debut albums
Peaches (musician) albums